Jhapa may refer to:

Location
Jhapa District, a district in Nepal
Jhapa rural municipality, a rural municipality in Jhapa District
Jhapa Baijanathpur, a village in Morang District

Sports
Jhapa Gold Cup, a football tournament held in Jhapa District
Jhapa XI, a football club in Jhapa District